Michael Gilchrist (born 9 August 1960) is New Zealand former athlete who competed mainly in middle-distance running. He competed at the 1982 Commonwealth Games and the 1986 Commonwealth Games.

Biography
At the 1982 Commonwealth Games Gilchrist finished seventh in the final of the 1500m and at the 1986 Commonwealth Games he was sixth in the 3000m steeplechase and did not qualify for the final of the 1500m.

References 

1960 births
Living people
New Zealand male middle-distance runners
New Zealand male steeplechase runners
Athletes (track and field) at the 1982 Commonwealth Games
Athletes (track and field) at the 1986 Commonwealth Games
Commonwealth Games competitors for New Zealand